The Porcupine-class sailing sixth rates were a series of ten 24-gun post ships built to a 1776 design by John Williams, that served in the Royal Navy during the American War Of Independence. Some survived to serve again in the French Revolutionary and the Napoleonic Wars. The first two were launched in 1777. Three were launched in 1778, three more in 1779, and the last two in 1781.

Design 

John Williams, the Surveyor of the Navy, designed the class as a development of his earlier design (1773) for the 20-gun Sphinx class. The 1776 design enlarged the ship, which permitted the mounting of an eleventh pair of 9-pounder guns on the upper deck and two smaller (6-pounder) guns on the quarterdeck.

Ships in class 

The Admiralty ordered ten ships to this design over a period of two years. The contract for the first ship was agreed on 25 June 1776 with Greaves, for launching in July 1777; the second was agreed with Adams on 6 August 1776, for launching in May 1777. The contract price for each was £10½ per ton BM; they were named Porcupine and Pelican by Admiralty Order on 27 August 1776. The contract price for Penelope was £11½ per ton BM.

References

 Rif Winfield, British Warships in the Age of Sail, 1714-1792: Design, Construction, Careers and Fates, Seaforth Publishing, Barnsley (2007). .

 
Ship classes